Rodney Cornell Perry (born September 11, 1953) is an American football coach and former left handed defensive back. He is currently the defensive backs coach for the Oregon State Beavers.

External links
 Indianapolis Colts bio
 Oregon State University Beavers bio

1953 births
Living people
Sportspeople from Fresno, California
American football cornerbacks
Colorado Buffaloes football players
Los Angeles Rams players
National Conference Pro Bowl players
Cleveland Browns players
Seattle Seahawks coaches
Los Angeles Rams coaches
Houston Oilers coaches
San Diego Chargers coaches
Carolina Panthers coaches
Indianapolis Colts coaches
Columbia Lions coaches